Phanuphong Phonsa (born 3 June 1994) is a Thai professional footballer who plays as a winger for Thai League 1 club Chonburi and the Thailand national team.

External links

1994 births
Living people
Phanuphong Phonsa
Phanuphong Phonsa
Association football midfielders
Phanuphong Phonsa
Phanuphong Phonsa
Phanuphong Phonsa